Imran Mahmudul is a Bangladeshi singer and composer. The following is a list of the songs recorded by Imran Mahmudul.

Studio albums

Solo albums

Shopnoloke (2011)

Tumi (2014)

Tumi Hina (2014)

Bolte Bolte Cholte Cholte (2015)

Collaborative albums

Milon (with Milon) (2014)

Premkabbo (with Shafiq Tuhin and Belal Khan) (2015)

Mon Karigor (with Tahsan) (2016)

Aaj Bhalobashona (with Kona and Bristy) (2016)

Adhek Tumi (with Bappa Mazumder) (2016)

EPs

Bahudore (2016)

Nancy with Stars (with Nancy) (2016)

Roop (2017)

Singles

Film soundtracks

As composer

As singer

Guest appearances

References

Mahmudul